Stedum is a village in Lower Saxony (Germany) belongs to the Hohenhameln Community; about 30 km south of Hanover, 14 km east of Hildesheim and 11 km west of Peine

There live 513 inhabitants compared to 9.311 inhabitants in the whole community.

The waste company (A+B Peine) for Hohenhameln and surroundings is located there.

Associations in Stedum are the volunteer fire department, the marksman corps, MTV Germania (sport club), Junggesellschaft (boys club), Beeke-Mädchen (girls club) and the Stedum-Bekum fondation.

References 

Lower Saxony